The following lists events from the year 2013 in Russia.

Incumbents
President of Russia: Vladimir Putin
Prime Minister of Russia: Dmitry Medvedev

Events

January
 January 3 - Vladimir Putin, the President of Russia, grants Russian citizenship to Gérard Depardieu who has renounced his French citizenship due to high taxes.
 January 4 - Six Russian tourists are killed and two tourists are seriously injured after a snowmobile towing a sled veers off a ski slope, crashes into a barrier, and flies into a ditch on Italy's Mount Cermis.
 January 15 - Russia launches three Kosmos series military-purpose satellites using Rokot launch vehicle.
 January 16 - Russian mafia boss Aslan Usoyan is killed in Moscow.
 January 17 - Russian dissident Alexandr Dolmatov commits suicide in Rotterdam.
 January 20 - At least four miners are killed and four others trapped after a fire at a mine in Prokopyevsky District, Kemerovo Oblast.
 January 22 - The Russian government organizes an evacuation from the Syrian Civil War for some of its citizens by transporting them to Lebanon and then flying them to Russia.
 January 24 - Russian police announces that 13 rebels, including Khuseyn Gakayev and his brother, are killed in fighting in the Vedensky District, Chechnya.
 January 24 - The government of Ukraine signs a major $10 billion shale gas deal with Royal Dutch Shell to reduce its dependency on Russian gas imports.
 January 25 - Scuffles occur on the streets of Moscow as supporters and opponents clash over the Russian parliament's attempts to implement anti-gay legislation. If legalised it would result in fines for those who promote events with a gay theme.
 January 31 - Volgograd passes a measure to refer to itself by its previous name, Stalingrad, on Victory Day and five key dates relating to the Battle of Stalingrad.

February
February 11 - An underground methane gas explosion killed up to 18 miners at a coal pit in northern Russia.
February 13 -President Vladimir Putin submits a bill that would ban Russian Cabinet members and other senior officials from having foreign bank accounts and owning foreign stock.
February 15 - A meteor broke up in the vicinity of the city of Chelyabinsk. According to Chelyabinsk's health department, around 1,200 people were injured, two of whom seriously, from the shattering of windows caused by the shockwaves and the debris.

March
March 28 - A bus crash in northwest Russia killed six people and injured at least 23 others, including orphans returning from a field trip.

April
April 22 - A man went on a shooting rampage outside a firearm shop in Belgorod, killing six people.
April 25 - The State Duma pass a bill banning government officials from holding overseas bank accounts and foreign-issued equities. The bill was backed by 443 deputies.
April 26 - A fire in a psychiatric hospital in the settlement of Ramensky killed 38 people.

May
May 1 - Three policemen were killed and two wounded after unknown assailants opened gun fire on their car in Buynaksk.
May 7 -, President Putin signed a new law (“Law 79-FZ”) forbidding government officials from holding overseas bank accounts. 
May 8 - A fuel train derailed in Rostov Oblast causing a massive fire with one person missing, 44 injured and 3,000 evacuated.
May 20 - At least four people were killed and 46 injured after two bombs exploded in the capital of Dagestan Republic, Makhachkala.

June
June 19 - At least 43 people sought medical help and more than 6,500 residents were evacuated in southwestern Samara Oblast, after ammunition explosions shook a military training area.
June 11 - The Russian gay propaganda law bill is unanimously approved by the State Duma (with just one MP abstaining.
June 30 - The Russian gay propaganda law bill is signed into law by President Vladimir Putin.

July
July 7 - Up to 80 people have been injured, after a passenger train derailed in the southern region of Krasnodar.
July 13 – 18 people were killed and 45 injured after a gravel truck smashed into a bus near Podolsk.

August
August 20 - police killed nine suspected militants, including a prominent warlord, in a clash in the restive North Caucasus republic of Dagestan.

September
September 10 - An embargo was imposed on imports of Moldovan wine.

September 13 – 37 people have died in a fire at a psychiatric hospital in Novgorod Region.

October
October 13 - Over 380 people were detained after an anti-migrant nationalist riot in southern Moscow.
October 21 - A suspected female suicide bomber has set off explosives on a bus in the southern city of Volgograd, killing six people and injuring 37.

November
November 17 - A passenger plane crashes at an airport in the city of Kazan, killing all 50 people on board.

Births

Deaths

January

January 2 - Yuri Alexandrov, 49, Russian boxer, heart attack.
January 4 - Yevgeny Pepelyaev, pilot (born 1918)

March

March 23 - Boris Berezovsky, 67, Russian business oligarch. (born 1946)

October

October 3 - Sergei Belov, 69, Russian professional basketball player. (born 1944)

See also 
 List of Russian films of 2013

References

External links

 
2010s in Russia
Years of the 21st century in Russia
Russia
Russia
Russia